Huangtong Township is a township under the administration of Jinxi County in Jiangxi, China. , it has 6 villages under its administration.

References 

Township-level divisions of Jiangxi
Jinxi County